PM2FHF (old call sign: PM3FHF, 88.0 FM), on-air name Mustang FM or Mustang 88.0 FM, is a commercial contemporary hit radio in Jakarta. Mahaka Radio Integra (MARI) owns 100% share of this radio station has the rest. Mustang 88.0 FM plays around all full Western Top 40 music along with Prambors FM.

History 
The radio starts back in 1987, nearly at the same time with discontinued Ramako FM (now Most Radio). Since it was found, the station focuses on young audience as main listeners. The frequency moved to 88.0 FM from previously 100.55 FM in 2004. Even though the frequency changed,

References

Radio stations in Jakarta